Skamandros may refer to:
 Scamander, a Greek river god
 Scamander River, a river in Anatolia
 Scamandrus, a town in ancient Anatolia